Rangpur Metropolitan Police is a newly formed police unit of Bangladesh Police, serving Rangpur City Corporation, Haragach Municipality, Sarai Union of Kaunia Upazila, and Kallayni Union of Pirgacha Upazila of Rangpur District. Rangpur Metropolitan Police started its all out operational activities on 16 September 2018. Nure Alam Mina is the commissioner of Rangpur Metropolitan Police.

History 
The government of Bangladesh announced plans to establish Rangpur Metropolitan Police and Gazipur Metropolitan Police in December 2015 in a Cabinet meeting chaired by Prime Minister Sheikh Hasina.

The Cabinet of Bangladesh led by Prime Minister Sheikh Hasina approved the draft of laws of establish Gazipur and Rangpur Metropolitan Police. 

The Rangpur Metropolitan Police was established by the "Rangpur Metropolitan Police Act, 2018" passed in the National Assembly of Bangladesh on 12 April 2018.

In April 2019, Kotwali police station officer in charge was accused of sexual harassment of a woman who had gone to the police station.

Nazmul Quader, officer in charge of Haragachh Police Station of Rangpur Metropolitan Police, was closed for letting a rape suspect go from police custody in February 2022.

Justices Mamnoon Rahman and Khandaker Diliruzzaman of Bangladesh High Court issued an order asking Rangpur Metropolitan Police to explain the custodial death of man in November 2021.

Police stations
 Kotwali
 Parshuram
 Haragach
 Tajhat
 Mahiganj
 Hajirhat

References

Bangladesh Police
Government of Rangpur, Bangladesh
Municipal law enforcement agencies of Bangladesh